Pomacle is a commune in the department of Marne, in the Grand Est region, northeastern France. It has 454 inhabitants (2017).

History
The occupation of the territory of Pomacle has a strong history, as the archeological searches reveal.   Based on the topographic dictionary of Marne, the term 'Pomacle' is certified for the first time in 1145 in the administrative archives from the village of Reims (Pomaclum).   This took effect by the Papal bull of Pope Eugene III. It confirmed immunity for the abbey of Saint Remi of Reims and for its dependence.

The origin of the name Pomacle remains unknown.   Perhaps the word "Pomum" should be understood with a Latin suffix, thus forming the equivalent of pometum or pomerutum and designate an orchard or fruit trees instead. The second hypothesis is that the name of Pommacle comes from the name of a brook, a tributary of the Suippe which waters the Bazancourt area. A (historical document?) previous to 1312 Tells us that Pomacle was a dependent of the Dean of Lavannes and thus he became the region's benefactor.   This document(?) also tells us that the church of Pomacle was placed under the double patronage of St Medard and St Gildart.  

Pomacle suffered greatly in 1650 during the troubles of the Insurrection and during the First World War.   On the second of September 1914, as the retreat of the French army continued, the inhabitants of Pomacle were forced to flee their village.   However, they are rapidly over outstripped by the German army and had to make a U-turn and return to their homes.   The victorious counter offensive forces the German army to retreat.   The front is stabilized and Pomacle, now occupied finds itself for four years at the very edge of the combat zones.   During the year 1917, the pressure of the French army became more pronounced and so the villagers were evacuated by order of the Germans on 19 March 1917 and directed through the railway(?) station to Douzy then to Villers-Cemay where they are accommodated in the homes of the locals.   the families are then directed to the other villages in the neighbourhood.

At the end of the war, when the inhabitants of Pomacle returned, the church had been destroyed and the four fifths of the houses were seriously damaged.   At first it was in these ruined houses that the Pomacains lived.   Then at the request of the disaster victims the Office of Liberated Regions provided some prefabricated huts for their use.   For many, this temporary housing lasted at least 4 years.

The principal activity of Pomacle is farming. In 1933, it had 36 farms. In 1963, there were no more than 26, and Pomacle, at the end of the year 2000 counted 10 agricultural concerns to which should be added 6 businesses whose principal activity is not agricultural. The principal crops are wheat, alfalfa, barley and beets, to which can be added some other crops such as asparagus, orchard grass, tobacco and rapeseed. The yields have been largely increased during the last 50 years. From 30 quintals per hectare for wheat in 1949, the yields today are at about 90 to 110 quintals. The evolution is comparable for the beet crop. In 1949 the yields were slightly higher at 30 tons per hectare.

It is on this land that has taken place(?) on 21 August 1983 The Festival of Harvest the final local ploughing contest??   It is also at Pomacle that the world championship of ploughing with the association with Terre Attitude, that will take place from 16 to 19 September 1999.

See also
Communes of the Marne department

References

Communes of Marne (department)